Happy FM (Ghana) is a privately owned radio station in Accra, the capital of Ghana, broadcasting on 98.9 MHz from Accra, Ghana. It began official transmission in September 2003 and is owned and run by the Global Media Alliance. "The Best Ever Sports Station in Ghana Broadcasting Sports News."

Programs and events 
Happy FM is known for its sports content for all audience at local and international stage. The station broadcasts in English language to its audience via 98.9 MHz and online. Happy FM is one of the radio stations in affiliation with B.B.C in Ghana.

Notable presenters 

 Samuel Eshun
 Dr Cann
 Samuel Amankwah  
DJ Adviser

References

External links 
HappyGhana.com
Streeming Online

Radio stations in Ghana
Greater Accra Region
Mass media in Accra